Blackville–Hilda High School is located in Blackville, South Carolina, United States, and is one of three public high schools in Barnwell County.  It is named for Blackville and for the nearby town of Hilda, which is also serves.

The Blackville–Hilda High School shooting occurred in 1995.

Notable alumni
 Troy Brown, former National Football League (NFL) player
 Joe Thomas, NFL player

References

External links
 Blackville–Hilda High School

Public high schools in South Carolina
Schools in Barnwell County, South Carolina